Clavus exilis is a species of sea snail, a marine gastropod mollusk in the family Drilliidae.

Description
The pupoid-claviform shell is small (8 mm or less). The 5½ teleoconch whorls are nearly plane and longitudinally plicately ribbed. The 15–22 axial ribs are small and close, descending from the sutures. The aperture is very short. The anal sulcus is moderately deep. The siphonal canal is short and open. The color of the shell is reddish chestnut, the ribs whitish, with a dark band below the middle of the body whorl.

Distribution
This marine species occurs in the Indian Ocean off KwaZuluNatal, South Africa, and Mozambique; in the Pacific Ocean off Polynesia

References

 Pease, W. H. 1868. Description of marine gasteropodae inhabiting Polynesia. Amer. J. Conch. 3: 211–222, pI. 15
 Garrett, A. 1873. Descriptions of new species of marine shells inhabiting the South Sea island. Proc. A cad. nat. Sci. Philad. 1873: 209–231, pIs. 2–3
 Maes, V. O. 1967. The littoral marine mollusks of Cocos-Keeling Islands (Indian Ocean). Proc. Acad. nat. Sci. Philad. 119(4): 93–127.
 R. N. Kilburn (1988), Turridae (Mollusca: Gastropoda) of southern Africa and Mozambique. Part 4. Subfamilies Drilliinae, Crassispirinae and Strictispirinae; Ann. Natal Mus. Vol. 29(1) Pages 167–320
 Tucker, J.K. 2004 Catalog of recent and fossil turrids (Mollusca: Gastropoda). Zootaxa 682:1–1295.

External links
 Specimen at MNHN, Paris

exilis